Victoria Roberts may refer to:

 Victoria A. Roberts (born 1951), United States federal judge
 Victoria Roberts (rower) (born 1978), Australian rower (also known as Vicky Roberts)
 Victoria Roberts (cartoonist), cartoonist and performer